Lygarina is a genus of South American dwarf spiders that was first described by Eugène Louis Simon in 1894.

Species
 it contains five species, found in Argentina, Brazil, Peru, and Venezuela:
Lygarina aurantiaca (Simon, 1905) – Argentina
Lygarina caracasana Simon, 1894 – Venezuela
Lygarina finitima Millidge, 1991 – Peru
Lygarina nitida Simon, 1894 (type) – Brazil
Lygarina silvicola Millidge, 1991 – Brazil

See also
 List of Linyphiidae species (I–P)

References

Araneomorphae genera
Linyphiidae
Spiders of South America